MDK is a 1997 computer game by Shiny.

MDK may also refer to:

Music
 "M.D.K.", a song by American electro band God Module from the album Seance
MDK, an electronic music producer based in Vancouver, Canada
 Mëkanïk Dëstruktïẁ Kömmandöh, a 1973 album from Magma

Other uses
 MDK (community), a group of communities on the social networking site VK.com
 MDK, Inc., the model railway manufacturing company that makes K-Line brand
 MDK, a human gene which makes a protein called Midkine
 mdk, ISO 639-3 code for the Mangbutu language
 MDK, the IATA code for Mbandaka Airport
 Minedykkerkommandoen, a Norwegian clearance diver force
 Jinan East railway station, see Jinan Metro

See also
 MDK-2M, a Soviet Cold War-era heavy artillery tractor